Roller sports competitions at the 2021 Junior Pan American Games in Cali, Colombia were held from 26 November to 4 December 2021. It comprises three disciplines: skateboarding, inline speed skating and artistic skating.

Medal summary

Medal table

Medalists

Skateboarding

Speed skating

Artistic skating

References

External links
Speed skating at the 2021 Junior Pan American Games
Artistic skating at the 2021 Junior Pan American Games
Skateboarding at the 2021 Junior Pan American Games

Karate
Junior Pan American Games
Qualification tournaments for the 2023 Pan American Games